The 1986 Women's Lacrosse World Cup was the second Women's Lacrosse World Cup and was played at Swarthmore College, Swarthmore, Pennsylvania from June 14–21, 1986. Australia defeated United States in the final to win the tournament. The tournament was sponsored by Brine.

Results

Table

Fifth Place Play Off (June 21)
England v Wales 18-2

Third Place Play Off (June 21)
Scotland v Canada 7-5

Final (June 21)
Australia v United States 10-7

References

2009 Women's
1986 in lacrosse
International lacrosse competitions hosted by the United States
Lacrosse World Cup
Women's lacrosse in the United States
Women's sports in Pennsylvania
1986 in Pennsylvania